Heber Eugenio Jara Valladares (27 December 1935 – 21 December 2014), known as Eugenio Jara, was a Chilean football manager and footballer.

Career

Club
Born in Talca, Jara played football for Ferrobadminton, O'Higgins and Colchagua and had a prolific career as football manager in Chile. He is well remembered by leading "Los Comandos" (The Commandos) from Magallanes, how they were nicknamed in the first half of the 1980s and that qualified to the 1985 Copa Libertadores, defeating Uruguayan club Bella Vista in the Estadio Centenario.

In the Chilean Primera División, he also coached Rangers de Talca, Ñublense, Naval, San Luis, Palestino and Unión San Felipe.

In the Chilean Segunda División, he coached Curicó Unido, Independiente de Cauquenes, Deportes Linares, Unión Santa Cruz, O'Higgins, Palestino, Unión San Felipe, Rangers de Talca and Deportes Arica. In 1979, he got the better season of Independiente de Cauquenes in its history, with the well remembered Brazilian striker  in the squad.

In addition, in 2000 he had a stint with Curicó Unido in the Tercera A.

Abroad, he was the manager of Peruvian club Sporting Cristal in the 1990 Torneo Descentralizado for three months.

National team
In 1987, he led the Chile national team in the Pan American Games, winning the silver medal. In addition, he got the first win of Chile against Argentina in an official match after defeating by 3–2 in the semi finals.

In 1988, he coached Chile U20 in the South American Championship.

Personal life
Jara died at the age of 78, after suffering the Alzheimer's disease.

Honours
Chile B
 Pan American Games Silver medal: 1987

References

External links
 Eugenio Jara at CeroaCero 

1935 births
2014 deaths
People from Talca
Chilean footballers
Badminton F.C. footballers
O'Higgins F.C. footballers
Deportes Colchagua footballers
Chilean Primera División players
Primera B de Chile players
Chilean football managers
Chilean expatriate football managers
Curicó Unido managers
Rangers de Talca managers
Ñublense managers
Magallanes managers
O'Higgins F.C. managers
San Luis de Quillota managers
Chile national football team managers
Chile national under-20 football team managers
Club Deportivo Palestino managers
Unión San Felipe managers
Sporting Cristal managers
San Marcos de Arica managers
Chilean Primera División managers
Primera B de Chile managers
Peruvian Primera División managers
Chilean expatriate sportspeople in Peru
Expatriate football managers in Peru